An election to North Tipperary County Council took place on 11 June 2004 as part of that year's Irish local elections. 21 councillors were elected from four electoral divisions by PR-STV voting for a five-year term of office.

Results by party

Results by Electoral Area

Borrisokane

Nenagh

Templemore

Thurles

External links

2004 Irish local elections
2004